Agostino Frassinetti (1897–1968) was an Italian freestyle swimmer who competed in the 1920 Summer Olympics and in the 1924 Summer Olympics. He was born in Genoa.

In 1920 he was a member of the Italian relay team which finished fifth in the 4 x 200 metre freestyle relay competition. In the 100 metre freestyle event he was eliminated in the semi-finals. Four years later at the Paris Games he was eliminated with the Italian relay team in the semi-finals of the 4 x 200 metre freestyle relay contest.

References

External links
 
 Report on Italian Olympic Swimmers 

1897 births
1968 deaths
Sportspeople from Genoa
Italian male swimmers
Olympic swimmers of Italy
Swimmers at the 1920 Summer Olympics
Swimmers at the 1924 Summer Olympics
Italian male freestyle swimmers
People from Sampierdarena